Ludger Schuknecht (born 2 December 1962 in Gelsenkirchen) is a German economist who has been serving as Vice President and Corporate Secretary of the Asian Infrastructure Investment Bank since 2021. 

From 2018 to 2021, Schuknecht was one of four Deputy Secretaries-General of the OECD, under the leadership of Secretaries-General José Ángel Gurría and Mathias Cormann.

Early life and education
Schuknecht studied Economics at Ludwig Maximilian University of Munich and George Mason University. In June 2000 he obtained his habilitation from the University of Constance.

Career
Previously Schuknecht was Chief Economist at the German Ministry of Finance and heading the Directorate General Fiscal Policy and International Financial and Monetary Policy there. In this role he advised Minister Wolfgang Schäuble on economic policy issues in the domestic and international sphere. He acted as the chief negotiator for Germany in the founding of Asian Infrastructure Investment Bank. Schuknecht left after the departure of the fiscally conservative Schäuble and the arrival of his social democrat successor Olaf Scholz. In 2019, he was replaced with Jakob von Weizsäcker.

Before that Schuknecht was Senior Advisor in the Directorate General of Economics of the European Central Bank where he prepared monetary policy decision making.

Schuknecht had also headed the ECB’s fiscal surveillance section and served with the World Trade Organization and the International Monetary Fund.

As a scholar, Schuknecht's research focuses on public expenditure policies and reform and the analysis of economic boom-bust episodes. Together with Vito Tanzi he published "Public Spending in the 20th Century: A Global Perspective".

Other activities
 Official Monetary and Financial Institutions Forum (OMFIF), Member of the Advisory Council
 Friedrich August von Hayek Foundation, Member of the Board of Trustees
 Ifo Institute for Economic Research, Member of the Board of Trustees

Personal life
Schuknecht is married and has three children.

References

German economists
OECD officials
World Trade Organization people
International Monetary Fund people
People from Gelsenkirchen
Living people
1962 births